Amor dividido (English title: Split Heart) is a Mexican telenovela that aired on Las Estrellas from 17 January 2022 to 12 June 2022. The series is produced by Angelli Nesma Medina for TelevisaUnivision. It is an adaptation of the Colombian telenovela Allá te espero. It stars Eva Cedeño, Gabriel Soto, Arturo Peniche, Irina Baeva, and Andrés Palacios.

Plot 
Abril (Eva Cedeño) and Max (Gabriel Soto) are two people who have nothing in common. For Abril, family is her priority, while for Max, being successful in the corporate world is the most important thing. She enjoys working in the fields and living in her hometown. He, despite being half Mexican, has completely forgotten his roots and is happy living in a first world country. For different reasons, both are forced to live in Mexico City and their lives begin to change radically until they are united in the midst of the loneliness and disappointment caused by the abandonment of their partners. Debra (Irina Baeva), Max's wife, decides to hide a pregnancy and resort to abortion without consulting her husband, who always had a strong desire to be a father. This fractures their marriage, and with Debra's unwillingness to adapt to the country her parents emigrated years ago, leads to divorce. Bruno (Andrés Palacios), Abril's husband, leaves her because his dream is to live in the United States, earning dollars to get ahead, following the example of his sister-in-law Julia (Elsa Ortiz), who a year ago decided to cross the border for the same reasons, leaving her two children, Lucero and Pancho, in charge of Abril, her sister, and mainly Cielo (Eugenia Cauduro), their mother.

Max arrives in Mexico to become the CEO of GoodFit and Abril receives the opportunity to be his personal assistant, with one condition: she must be single and childless in order to be available at all times. Because of her financial need, Abril makes the mistake of hiding the fact that she has a son, Hugo. In San Antonio, Bruno finds himself living a nightmare as an illegal immigrant. As soon as he has the opportunity, Bruno becomes the right hand of Minerva (Jessica Mas), a dangerous woman that is the head of an immigrant smuggling ring. The business leaves Bruno with a lot of money and to wrongly achieve what he dreamed of: to have it all. After a while, Bruno convinces Abril to travel with their son and start a new life in the United States. For cost reasons, they travel on separate flights. Hugo arrives in San Antonio, while Abril is deported because of Minerva, who arranged for the authorities to discover that Abril was going to stay illegally, as she was not going to allow her to ruin her plans to be with Bruno. With no hope of returning to the United States, Abril asks Bruno to return to Mexico with Hugo, but he is no longer willing to have the humble life he had before.

Abril vows to herself to do everything she can to get her son back. When Max confesses that he loves her and asks her to marry him, Abril accepts because she has also fallen in love with him. What motivates Abril the most to accept the marriage is to get her son back, since by marrying an American she could enter the United States to rescue her son, who is sad because of the abuses of Minerva, Bruno's lover. Abril and Max get married, but her happiness is in danger, since having married while hiding from Max that she has a son, could provoke the scorn of her new husband, the impossibility of recovering her son, and losing everything.

Cast

Main 
 Eva Cedeño as Abril Moreno
 Gabriel Soto as Max Stewart
 Arturo Peniche as Alejo Núñez
 Irina Baeva as Debra Puig
 Andrés Palacios as Bruno García
 José Elías Moreno as Domingo Moreno
 Gabriela Rivero as Rosaura Sánchez
 Eugenia Cauduro as Cielo Sánchez
 Elsa Ortiz as Julia Moreno
 Pedro Moreno as Amaury Ramírez
 Jessica Mas as Minerva Ortiz
 Ramiro Fumazoni as Fabricio Zepeda
 Lisardo as Lorezno Iñíguez
 Marco Méndez as Valente Tovar
 Pedro Sicard as Phillipe Charpentier
 Julio Mannino as Benicio Quintana
 Lambda García as Danilo Medina
 Federico Ayos as Gabriel Núñez
 Laura Vignatti as Joana Foglia
 Alfredo Gatica as José
 Pablo Valentín as Picasso
 Fabián Robles as Kevin Hernández
 Fernando Robles as Miguel
 Roberto Tello as Mike
 Pato de la Garza as Pancho Tovar
 Iker García as Hugo García
 Paulina Ruíz as Lucero Tovar
 Sergio Madrigal as Renán de la Riva
 Iván Ochoa as Pipe

Recurring 
 Jorge Gallegos as Osmar Gómez
 Ricardo Franco as Ramiro Salcedo
 Ligia Uriarte as Sonia Escobar
 Mar Bonelli as Xiomara Sosa
 Abril Schreiber as Mariana
 Luis Xavier as Silvio
 Francisco Avendaño as Ismael Puig
 Mara Cuevas as Enedina Alatriste
 Ricardo Vera as Pedro Zepeda
 Jorge Ortín as Sinesio Ramos
 Alejandro Peniche as Jerónimo
 Carlo Guerra as Jorge Gallardo
 Fermín Zúñiga as Fermín Zamora
 Andrea Guerrero as Esther
 Jessy Santacreu as Fabiola
 Rocío Leal as Norma Quiñonez
 Haydeé Navarra as Sofía

Production 
The telenovela was announced on 15 October 2020 at Televisa's Visión21 upfront with the working title Allá te espero. Filming began on 4 October 2021 and ended in March 2022. Filming took place in México City, Zacatlán, Puebla, and San Antonio, Texas. The official title of the telenovela was announced on 8 November 2021.

Ratings 
 
}}

Episodes

Notes

References

External links 
 

2021 telenovelas
2022 Mexican television series debuts
2022 Mexican television series endings
2020s Mexican television series
Televisa telenovelas
Mexican telenovelas
Spanish-language telenovelas
Mexican television series based on Colombian television series
2020s LGBT-related drama television series
Mexican LGBT-related television shows